The  is a contemporary art museum founded by the real estate developer Minoru Mori (1934–2012) in the Roppongi Hills Mori Tower in the Roppongi Hills complex both of which he built in Tokyo, Japan.

The exterior architect of the museum's galleries on the 35th floor of the 45
-story tower in which the museum is housed is Richard Gluckman of Gluckman Mayner Architects. The museum does not exhibit a permanent collection but rather temporary exhibitions of works by contemporary artists.

Artists whose work has been exhibited at the museum include Ai Weiwei, Gohar Dashti, Tokujin Yoshioka and Bill Viola.

The museum's founder Minoru Mori died in March 2012. The museum focuses on contemporary art and primarily exhibits works of Asian artists.
It also features the MAM project which exhibits solo shows on a smaller scale in the museum space.

In 2015 the museum exhibited Dinh Q. Lê's solo exhibition.

Museum Directors 
The first director of Mori Art Museum was David Elliott (2003-2006), followed by Fumio Nanjo (2006-2019). At the end of 2019, chief curator Mami Kataoka was announced as the successor to Fumio Nanjo.

Collection 
The Mori Art Museum has a collection which includes artworks by Ai Weiwei, Makoto Aida, Jananne Al-Ani, Tarek Al-Ghoussein, Halim Al-Karim, Poklong Anading, Satoru Aoyama, Bae Young Whan, Cao Fei, Chen Chieh-Jen, Chen Wenbo, Chiba Masaya, Chim↑Pom, Gohar Dashti, Romain Erkiletlian, Etsuko Fukaya, Shilpa Gupta, Laurent Grasso, Ham Jin, Handiwirman Saputra, Maiko Haruki, Naoya Hatakeyama, Satoshi Hirose, Hoang Duong Cam, Ho Tzu Nyen, Mako Idemitsu, Manabu Ikeda, Takashi Ishida, Takahiro Iwasaki, Jakarta Wasted Artists, Teppei Kaneuji, Mari Katayama, Mika Kato, Tsubasa Kato, Sachiko Kazama, Kensaku Yuree, Tomoko Kikuchi, Takehito Koganezawa, Akino Kondoh, Tomoko Konoike, Sutee Kunavichayanontv, Yayoi Kusama, Jompet Kuswidananto, Dinh Q. Lê, Lee Bul, Lee Wen, Lim Sokchanlina, Fuyuko Matsui, Tomona Matsukawa, Prabhavathi Meppayil, Futoshi Miyagi, Ryuji Miyamoto, Mariko Mori, Ruriko Murayama, Mwkaiyama Kisho, Nobuhiro Nakanishi, Kohei Nawa, Jun Nguyen-Hatsushiba, Yoshinori Niwa, Hitoshi Nomura, Motohiko Odani, Yuki Okumura, Yoko Ono, Oiwa Oscar, Tatsumi Orimoto, Tsuyoshi Ozawa, Jagannath Panda, Pangrok Sulap, Po Po, Chatchai Puipia, Araya Rasdjarmrearnsook, Navin Rawanchaikul, RongRong & inri, Hrair Sarkissian, Momoko Seto, Hiraki Sawa, Shao Yinong / Mu Chen, Taro Shinoda, Motoyuki Shitamichi, Song Hyun-Sook, Suh Do Ho, Yukihiro Taguchi, Koki Tanaka, Nobuyuki Tanaka, Rodel Tapaya, Tateishi Tiger, Teruya Yuken, Tromarama, Tsai Charwei, Tsang Kin-Wah, UJINO, Kazuki Umezawa, Vandy Rattana, Wang Qingsong, Entang Wiharso, Weng Fen, Won Seoung Won, John Wood and Paul Harrison, Aki Yahata, Akira Yamaguchi, Takayuki Yamamoto, Chikako Yamashiro, Miwa Yanagi, Haegue Yang, Yee I-Lann, Yin Xiuzhen, Shizuka Yokomizo, Yuichi Yokoyama, Tomoko Yoneda, Ken + Julia Yonetani, Yoo Seungho, Yuan Goang-Ming, Zhang O, Zhou Tiehai

References

External links

 Mori Art Museum website  

Museums with year of establishment missing
Art museums and galleries in Tokyo
Mori, Minoru
Contemporary art galleries in Japan
Mori Building
Buildings and structures in Minato, Tokyo
Roppongi